Rocky Turner (born August 6, 1950) is a former American football defensive back and wide receiver. Turner was a 10th Round Draft Choice by the New York Jets of the National Football League and played for the Jets from 1972 to 1974. He was named on the Chattanooga Football All-Century Football Team in 2003 and is currently enjoying a successful career as a pediatric dentist.

References

1950 births
Living people
American football defensive backs
American football wide receivers
Chattanooga Mocs football players
New York Jets players
Players of American football from Augusta, Georgia